
Gmina Dobiegniew is an urban-rural gmina (administrative district) in Strzelce-Drezdenko County, Lubusz Voivodeship, in western Poland.

Villages
Apart from the town of Dobiegniew, Gmina Dobiegniew contains the villages and settlements of Chomętowo, Chrapów, Czarnolesie, Dębnik, Dębogóra, Derkacze, Głusko, Grabionka, Grąsy, Grzmikoło, Jarychowo, Kamienna Knieja, Kępa Zagajna, Kowalec, Kubczyce, Łęczyn, Lipinka, Lubiewko, Ługi, Ługowo, Mierzęcin, Młodolino, Moczele, Mostniki, Niemiennica, Niwy, Nowy Młyn, Osieczek, Osiek, Osowiec, Ostrowiec, Ostrowiec-Osada, Ostrowite, Podlesiec, Podszkle, Pokręt, Radachowo, Radęcin, Rolewice, Rozkochowo, Sarbinowo, Sitnica, Sławica, Słonów, Słowin, Starczewo, Stare Osieczno, Suchów, Świnki, Urszulanka, Wilczy Dół, Wołogoszcz and Żeleźnica.

Neighbouring gminas
Gmina Dobiegniew is bordered by the gminas of Bierzwnik, Człopa, Drawno, Drezdenko, Krzyż Wielkopolski, Stare Kurowo and Strzelce Krajeńskie.

Twin towns – sister cities

Gmina Dobiegniew is twinned with:
 Amt Golzow, Germany

References

Dobiegniew
Strzelce-Drezdenko County